City Sightseeing is an open-top, sightseeing tour bus operator. It provides tour bus services in more than 130 cities around the world. As City Sightseeing has grown and expanded, the company now also provides boat tours, sightseeing train tours, and guided walking tours.

The buses pass by main tourist attractions and major landmarks, while a prerecorded audio commentary is provided through headphones in multiple languages giving important facts and information about what is being seen. Many tours also have a live guide. Tourists may board and leave the buses within their ticket's time limit at the different bus stops on the circular routes. This is called hop-on-hop-off. Many cities have more than one route to showcase all the different sights and attractions.  On some routes, buses leave the city for suburban sights. In some cities (New York City, Philadelphia, Sharjah) buses even operate at night. In some cities (Moscow, Cape Town, Amsterdam, Boston) a boat tour is also available. The United Kingdom, Italy, Spain, and the United States are the countries with the largest number of cities with City Sightseeing service.

Each city has different ticketing options available, which range from a 24-hour pass to a 14-day pass. Furthermore, many tours include discounts for local attractions and restaurants. There are even bundle packs, where customers can buy tickets for several attractions when they purchase a bus or boat ticket. In 2015, more than 14 million tourists hopped-on a City Sightseeing tour.

In 2015, US officials raised safety concerns about City Sightseeing tours after certain irregularities were discovered and a major crash occurred in San Francisco.

Company history
The City Sightseeing name was first used in 1972 after Peter Newman used it for his City Coach Lines company, which ran tours of London four times a day.

In 1998, Ensignbus revived the name and developed the red livery in the Spanish city of Seville. There it helped an established sightseeing operator relaunch itself with double-deckers, using the experience and expertise developed with London Pride Sightseeing, through Ensignbus' vehicle business. With the sale of the London Pride Sightseeing, Peter Newman stated his intention to introduce a global brand of sightseeing buses. It also set up operations in Sydney, Australia, not as a franchise, but directly owned, during this year.

In March 2000, the franchise model was initiated, with tours starting in Glasgow, Scotland. Startup operations employed a British manager until local staff were trained. During this year, operations expanded in the UK in York, Edinburgh, and Bath. Edinburgh's Lothian Buses introduced the first purpose-built open top low floor buses. In December of that year, the online booking system was introduced.

In 2001, operations expanded further in the UK, Spain, Australia, and into Copenhagen, Denmark.

In 2002, operations in Alberta, Canada opened but have since closed. Ensignbus acquired City Sightseeing's biggest rival, Guide Friday, which had a base in Stratford-upon-Avon and operated tours across the UK and in major European cities. Operations were either rebranded as City Sightseeing, or absorbed into existing operators where Guide Friday had been a direct competitor. The acquisition brought City Sightseeing's operations up to nearly 70 cities worldwide with nearly 250 vehicles.

In 2003, operations started in Italy. During this year, City Sightseeing introduced the first purpose-built sightseeing bus. It was an Ayats Bravo City bodied Volvo B7Ls. They featured equipment specifically designed for tours and were "Low floor." These appeared first in Spain and then in the UK. By 2004 they were featured around the world.

Since 2004, the company has been part of Singapore Ducktours, sold to RATP Group in September 2014. Both London and Singapore's City Sightseeing operations are under Extrapolitan Sightseeing Group.

Ensignbus owned the operations in Bath, Cardiff, Eastbourne and Windsor until its subsidiary, Bath Bus Company, was sold to the RATP Group in February 2011. It also owned the operation in Cambridge and Stratford-upon-Avon, but these were passed to Stagecoach, who also provided normal bus services in that area.

In 2011, Ensignbus sold its 100% ownership of the business to the Spanish franchisee Enrique Ybarra's City Sightseeing Worldwide of Spain.

Ensignbus retained its ownership of City Sightseeing in Sydney, but sold its interest in City Sightseeing Italy and its shareholding in Washington, D.C. This was sold to Big Bus Tours in September 2011. Sydney, along with several other locations, including Munich, Frankfurt, Perth and Bristol have all left City Sightseeing, and now operate independently. The Mornington Peninsula service which commenced 1 November 2014, ceased on 25 January 2015.

According to its website in April 2021, City Sightseeing had operations in 78 cities in 31 countries.

Safety issues
In November 2015, a City Sightseeing bus injured 20 people in a crash at Union Square, San Francisco. The police concluded that this was due to driver error, although the driver maintained that the brakes had failed.

A city official questioned the safety of City Sightseeing tours, and the California Public Utilities Commission released a statement describing various irregularities and problems with City Sightseeing, including multiple permit suspensions since 2007 due to security infractions.

Franchise model
The company has been largely developed along the franchise model. Some operations were completely owned by City Sightseeing, while some were joint ventures; however, the majority of tours are now operated by franchisees.

At a minimum, the franchise operator must use the City Sightseeing red base colour and graffiti style. They must use the global booking web-site, though many operate their own websites as well, and a percentage of the revenue is paid to City Sightseeing.

See also
Big Bus Tours
Gray Line
New York Skyride
Sightseeing

References

External links

Company website

 
1999 establishments in England
Bus transport brands
Bus transport in the United Kingdom
Bus transport in Spain
Transport companies of Spain
Travel and holiday companies of the United Kingdom
Seville
Companies of Andalusia